More Than Family is a 2020 South Korean family comedy film directed by Choi Ha-na and starring Krystal Jung, Jang Hye-jin, Choi Deok-moon, Shin Jae-hwi and Nam Moon-chul. It revolves around To-il, (Krystal Jung) who gets pregnant while dating her tutoring student. 
The film was premiered at Busan International Film Festival on October 25, 2020. It was released in theaters in South Korea on November 12, 2020. And it was available on iQiyi on December 26 (for Indonesia, Malaysia, Philippines, Singapore, and Thailand).

Synopsis
Kim To-il (Krystal Jung) gets pregnant while dating her 19 years old tutoring student. Her mother and step-father are not pleased with the situation, so she decides to track down her biological father whom she has not seen for 15 years. The journey to find him brings back memories of her birth father and her step-father. When she realizes that she wasn't ready to face her father, she runs into him. Meanwhile, her step father, Tae Hyo is disappointed that she left them to find her birth father. In her absence, the father of the baby disappears. When the two fathers meet, they end up embarking on a quest to find him, which unfolds a series of playful happenings.

Cast
 Krystal Jung as Kim To-il
 Shin Jae-hwi as Jang Ho-hoon, To-Il's boyfriend
 Jang Hye-jin as Seon-myeong
 Choi Deok-moon as Tae Hyo, To-Il's stepfather
 Nam Moon-chul as Ho Hoon's father
 Lee Hae-young as Hwan Gyu
 Kang Mal-geum as Ho Hoon's mother
 Bang Jae-ho as Mediator

Production
In July 2019, Krystal Jung was cast to play lead role in the film. It is debut film of Choi Ha-na as director. The filming began on August 13, 2019 and completed by the end of September 2019.

Reception

Box office
The film was released on November 12, 2020.

As per review aggregator Naver Movie Database, the film holds 50th place on box office as of December 6, 2020.

Critical response

Going by Korean review aggregator Naver Movie Database, the film holds an approval rating of 8.21 from the audience.

Awards and nominations

References

External links
 
 
 
 

2020s Korean-language films
2020 films 
South Korean comedy films
2020 directorial debut films
2020s pregnancy films
2020 comedy films